The Boone River Bridge is a historic structure located north of Goldfield, Iowa, United States.  It is a 6-panel,  Warren Pony truss span over the Boone River. The construction began in 1910. The bridge was built in 1912 by the Iowa Bridge Company using steel fabricated at the Cambria steel mills in Johnstown, Pennsylvania. The Boone River Bridge is one of the few remaining multiple span pin-connected Pratt trusses in the state.  It was listed on the National Register of Historic Places in 1998.

The bridge was rehabilitated in 1940.

References

Bridges completed in 1912
Transportation buildings and structures in Wright County, Iowa
Road bridges on the National Register of Historic Places in Iowa
Truss bridges in Iowa
National Register of Historic Places in Wright County, Iowa
Steel bridges in the United States
Warren truss bridges in the United States
1912 establishments in Iowa